Gunung Tua is a town in North Sumatra province of Indonesia and it is the seat (capital) of North Padang Lawas Regency.
Gunung Tua is a district which is also the administrative center (capital city) North Padang Lawas Regency, North Sumatra, Indonesia. Formerly Gunung Tua is a district (part of South Tapanuli Regency). And finally on July 17, 2007 Gunung Tua endorsed as the capital of North Padang Lawas Regency (which is a formerly part of the District of South Tapanuli Regency).

Climate
Gunung Tua has a tropical rainforest climate (Af) with moderate rainfall from June to August and heavy rainfall in the remaining months.

References

Populated places in North Sumatra
Regency seats of North Sumatra